The women's 10 kilometre freestyle at the 2017 Asian Winter Games was held on 21 February 2017 at the Shirahatayama Open Stadium in Sapporo, Japan.

Schedule
All times are Japan Standard Time (UTC+09:00)

Results
Legend
DNF — Did not finish

References

External links
Results at FIS website

Women 10